Rikke Bogetveit Nygård (born 22 May 2000) is a Norwegian futsal player and a footballer who plays as a midfielder for Toppserien club Vålerenga and the Norway women's national team.

References

External links

2000 births
Living people
Norwegian women's footballers
Women's association football midfielders
Toppserien players
Arna-Bjørnar players
Norway women's international footballers
Norway women's youth international footballers
Norwegian women's futsal players